is a women's football club playing in Japan's football league, the Nadeshiko League Division 1. Its hometown is the city of Iwata, Shizuoka.

Squad

Current squad
As of 22 December 2022.

Results

Coaching staff

Transition of team name
Shizuoka Sangyo University Iwata Ladies : 2008 - 2009
Shizuoka Sangyo University Iwata Bonita : 2010 – Present

References

External links 
 Shizuoka Sangyo University Iwata Bonita official site
 List of women's football clubs in Japan

Women's football clubs in Japan
2012 establishments in Japan
Japan Women's Football League teams
Sports teams in Shizuoka Prefecture